Carlos Saladrigas Zayas (Carlos Eduardo Ramón Saladrigas y Zayas; October 13, 1900 – 15 April 1956) was a Cuban politician and diplomat.

Career 
He was an abogado-notario who served as Senator (1936-1940), Minister of Justice (1934), Foreign Minister (1933) and (1955-1956), Prime Minister of Cuba (1940-1942), Ambassador to Great Britain, and presidential candidate in the elections of 1944.

Personal life 
He was the son of Enrique Saladrigas Lunar and María Luisa Zayas y Diago.  He married his wife, María de las Mercedes González-Llorente y Martínez in 1923 and they had two children, Gloria and Carlos Saladrigas y González-Llorente.  He later married Esperanza Plasencia y del Peso and lastly Cusa Carrillo.

References
 Fulgencio Batista: Volume 1, From Revolutionary to Strongman, Argote-Freyre, Frank (Rutgers, New Jersey:Rutgers University Press, 2006)  
 Los Propietarios de Cuba 1958, Guillermo Jimenez Soler (Havana, Cuba: Editorial de Ciencias Sociales, 2007)
 Anuario Social de La Habana 1939, (Luz-Hilo, S.A.) 
 Directorio Social de La Habana 1948, (P. Fernandez y Cia, S. en C.) 
 Libro de Oro de la Sociedad Habanera 1949, (Editorial Lex) 
 Libro de Oro de la Sociedad Habanera 1950, (Editorial Lex) 
 Registro Social de La Habana 1958, (Molina y Cia, S.A.) 
  (Spanish)

Cuban senators
Foreign ministers of Cuba
Prime Ministers of Cuba
1900 births
1957 deaths
People from Havana
Cuban diplomats
Cuban notaries
Ambassadors of Cuba to the United Kingdom
1930s in Cuba
1940s in Cuba
1950s in Cuba
20th-century Cuban politicians
Popular Socialist Party (Cuba) politicians